Ben Orton (born 24 July 1986) is a New Zealand cricketer. He played in three Twenty20 matches for Wellington in 2013.

See also
 List of Wellington representative cricketers

References

External links
 

1986 births
Living people
New Zealand cricketers
Wellington cricketers
Cricketers from Hastings, New Zealand